Robert Darwin (1766–1848) was a British physician and father of Charles Darwin.

Robert Darwin may also refer to:
 Robert Darwin of Elston (1682–1754), lawyer father of Erasmus Darwin

 Robert Waring Darwin of Elston (1724–1816), English botanist
 Robin Darwin (born Robert Vere Darwin; 1910–1974), British artist, great-grandson of Charles Darwin